Li Qian (born 30 July 1986 in Baoding) is a Chinese-Polish female table tennis player, who currently lives in Tarnobrzeg and represents the team of Siarka Tarnobrzeg.

Career
Li Qian became a naturalised citizen of Poland in November 2007. In early 2008, Li Qian became the first ever female Polish table tennis player to take part in the prestigious TOP-12 in Frankfurt am Main. She reached the final, losing to Li Jiao from the Netherlands. She competed for Poland at the Beijing 2008, London 2012, Rio 2016 and Tokyo 2020 Summer Olympics.

In May 2008, she was 26th in the world rank of the International Table Tennis Federation, and fifth in the European rank of the ITTF.

In February 2009, she won the TOP-12 in Düsseldorf, defeating Li Jie in the final match. Li Qian was ranked 3rd in Europe and 22nd on the world ranking list.

References

External links
Li Qian - without pressure at the Olympic Games

1986 births
Living people
Polish female table tennis players
Table tennis players at the 2008 Summer Olympics
Table tennis players at the 2012 Summer Olympics
Table tennis players at the 2016 Summer Olympics
Olympic table tennis players of Poland
Naturalized citizens of Poland
Chinese emigrants to Poland
Table tennis players at the 2015 European Games
Table tennis players at the 2019 European Games
European Games medalists in table tennis
European Games bronze medalists for Poland
Table tennis players from Baoding
Chinese female table tennis players
Naturalised table tennis players
World Table Tennis Championships medalists
Table tennis players at the 2020 Summer Olympics